Rareș is a Romanian masculine given name.

Peter IV Rareș, prince of Moldavia
Marculescu Rareș, profesional informatician
Ilie II Rareș, prince of Moldavia
Rareș Chintoan, Romanian wrestler
Rareș Cuzdriorean, Romanian tennis player
Rareș Dumitrescu, Romanian fencer
Rareș Enceanu Romanian footballer
Rareș Mandache Romanian basketball player
Rareș Șerban, commonly known as Chris Șerban, Canadian soccer player
Rareș Soporan, Romanian footballer
Rareș Vârtic, Romanian footballer

See also 
Petru Rareș, Bistrița-Năsăud, a commune in Bistrița-Năsăud County, Romania
Rareș, a village in Mărtiniș Commune, Harghita County, Romania

Romanian masculine given names